Limonia yakushimensis is a crane fly in the family Limoniidae. The species occurs in the Palearctic region. L. yakushimensis is known to rear its young in the fruit bodies of the fungus  Lactarius volemus.

References

Limoniidae
Insects described in 1930
Taxa named by Charles Paul Alexander